Kermit Roosevelt III (born July 14, 1971) is an American author, lawyer, and legal scholar.  He is a law professor at the University of Pennsylvania. He is a  great-great-grandson of United States President Theodore Roosevelt and a distant cousin of President Franklin D. Roosevelt.

Early life
Roosevelt was born in Washington, D.C. on July 14, 1971. His father, also named Kermit, was a great-grandson of President Theodore Roosevelt. He graduated from St. Albans School (where he was a Presidential Scholar), Harvard University, and Yale Law School. He was a law clerk for Judge Stephen F. Williams of the D.C. Circuit, and clerked for U.S. Supreme Court Justice David Souter.

Career
Roosevelt worked as a lawyer with Mayer Brown in Chicago from 2000 to 2002 before joining the Penn Law faculty in 2002.

Roosevelt's areas of academic interest include conflicts of law and constitutional law. He has published in the Virginia Law Review, the Michigan Law Review, and the Columbia Law Review, among others, and his articles have been cited twice by the United States Supreme Court and numerous times by state and lower federal courts.

Some of his recent scholarly publications include "Detention and Interrogation in the Post-9/11 World," delivered as the Donahue Lecture at Suffolk University Law School in 2008, "Guantanamo and the Conflict of Laws: Rasul and Beyond" (2005), published in the University of Pennsylvania Law Review, "Constitutional Calcification: How the Law Becomes What the Court Does," University of Virginia Law Review (2005), and "Resolving Renvoi: the Bewitchment of Our Intelligence by Means of Language," University of Notre Dame Law Review (2005).

Roosevelt has also written two novels, both of which dramatize legal settings.

Roosevelt's scholarship concerns constitutional law, the Supreme Court, national security and civil liberties, US Presidential history, and Japanese American internment. He is a frequent contributor to national and international media outlets, including Time, The New York Times, The Huffington Post, and Newsmax. His TEDx talk (June, 2016) is entitled "Myth America: The Declaration, the Constitution, and Us."

Activities

In December, 2015, Kermit Roosevelt was a keynote speaker at The Commonwealth Club in San Francisco, California. Karen Korematsu, daughter of Fred Korematsu and director of The Korematsu Institute, attended the event. In May, 2016, Roosevelt and Karen Korematsu were featured speakers at the National Constitution Center for a program entitled, "Civil Liberties in Times of Crisis." Jess Bravin, the Supreme Court correspondent for The Wall Street Journal, served as moderator. It is the first time a member of the Roosevelt family and a member of the Korematsu family appeared in a public forum.

Roosevelt is a Distinguished Research Fellow of the Annenberg Public Policy Center at the University of Pennsylvania and a member of the American Law Institute. In November 2014, the American Law Institute announced that Roosevelt had been selected as the Reporter for the Third Restatement of Conflict of Laws. Roosevelt is also a lecturer for Kaplan Bar Review.  He prepares students in all 50 states for the Constitutional Law portion of the bar exam.

Reception of novels

Roosevelt's first novel, In the Shadow of the Law, had generally positive reviews.  Alan Dershowitz, writing in The New York Times, said that although the book
suffers from the showoffy-ness of an aspiring artiste strutting his stuff … yet I recommend this book with real enthusiasm. Why? Precisely because it doesn't glamorize its subject. Roosevelt's gritty portrayal of the transformation of bright-eyed and colorful young associates into dim-eyed and gray middle-aged partners (no one seems to make it to his or her golden years) rings true of all too many corporate law factories.
The novel was a Christian Science Monitor Best Book of the Year.  In 2006, Paramount filmed a pilot episode (written by Carol Mendelsohn) for a TV series based on the novel, starring Joshua Jackson, Frank Langella, Kevin Pollak, Monet Mazur, and Alan Tudyk.

His second novel, Allegiance, published in 2015, was a Harper Lee Prize finalist. It received favorable reviews in The Wall Street Journal ("well worth reading") and The Richmond Times-Dispatch ("splendid, troubling, and authoritative") and a starred review from Publishers Weekly. Based on actual events, the story examines U.S. national security policies during World War II, focusing on President Franklin D. Roosevelt's executive order 9066, which authorized the internment of Japanese Americans. Roosevelt studied court documents and personal diaries of key political figures, including Supreme Court Justice Hugo Black, J. Edgar Hoover, Felix Frankfurter, and Francis Biddle, to accurately portray the circumstances and motivations behind the decisions that led to the internment. Allegiance recaptures the legal debates within the US government, including the Supreme Court cases Hirabayashi v. United States and Korematsu v. United States, and explores the moral issues surrounding U.S. national security policies.

In January, 2015, the Japan Society hosted an event featuring Kermit Roosevelt and actor/activist George Takei, who was five years old when he and his family were forced into an internment camp. Takei called Roosevelt's book Allegiance, "A rip-roaring good read."

Books

Nonfiction

Fiction

See also 
 List of law clerks of the Supreme Court of the United States (Seat 3)

References

External links
 Kermit Roosevelt Official Website
 University of Pennsylvania Faculty Webpage

1971 births
21st-century American novelists
American male novelists
Bulloch family
Conflict of laws scholars
Harvard University alumni
Illinois lawyers
Law clerks of the Supreme Court of the United States
Living people
Members of the American Law Institute
Novelists from Pennsylvania
Kermit
St. Albans School (Washington, D.C.) alumni
American scholars of constitutional law
University of Pennsylvania Law School faculty
Yale Law School alumni
21st-century American male writers